A matground is a strong surface layer of bacterial fauna that hardened the surface of seabeds in the Proterozoic and early Cambrian. It is sometimes called "elephant skin" from its appearance when found in fossil deposits. It is theorized that matgrounds disappeared when priapulid worms evolved to be hardy and ubiquitous enough to break the matground when burrowing.

See also
Cambrian substrate revolution

References

Proterozoic life